Liu Shao  may refer to:
 Liu Shao (Three Kingdoms), an official of Cao Wei (also known as the Kingdom of Wei) during the Three Kingdoms period
 Liu Shao (Liu Song), an emperor between 453 and 454, after assassinating his father, Emperor Wen of Liu Song